NetMiner is an application software for exploratory analysis and visualization of large network data based on SNA(Social Network Analysis). It can be used for general research and teaching in social networks. This tool allows researchers to explore their network data visually and interactively, helps them to detect underlying patterns and structures of the network.
It features data transformation, network analysis, statistics, visualization of network data, chart, and a programming language based on the Python script language. Also, it enables users to import unstructured text data(e.g. news, articles, tweets, etc.) and extract words and network from text data. In addition, NetMiner SNS Data Collector, an extension of NetMiner, can collect some social networking service(SNS) data with a few clicks.

It has been released in 2001 as a commercial analysis software specialized in social network analysis. There are various license not only for commercial use, but also for non-commercial academic use. The current version is 4 for Microsoft Windows (2000 or later version).

Release history
The first version of NetMiner was released on Dec 21, 2001. There have been four major updates from 2001.

NetMiner 
Released on December 21, 2001.
Network analysis modules and network visualization modules were integrated to one package
User interface for data analysis and management was added
Generic data structure for multi-layer network was introduced

NetMiner 2 
Released on April 9, 2003.
Modules for importing external data were introduced
Some measures and methods for network analyses and statistical analyses are added and improved
Some algorithms for visualization processes are added and improved

NetMiner 3 
Released on May 15, 2007.
Data structure was improved for huge network analysis
Analysis and visualization modules are integrated to support standardized analysis processes
Data import modules to access external DB such as Oracle and MS SQL were introduced
Environments for visualization and analysis were integrated to one

NetMiner 4 
Released on May 10, 2011.
Python-based NetMiner Script was introduced
Encryption module for NMF format was added
Diffusion, Mining modules was added (Version 4.1.0.b.130318)
Two mode analysis modules and Mining(Classification, Regression, Anomaly Detection, Frequent Subgraph etc.) was added (Version: 4.2.0)
Morphological analyzer and new features(Word Cloud, Topic modeling algorithm, etc.) for Semantic network analysis was introduced. (Version 4.3.0)
Extension 'SNS Data Collector(Twitter, Facebook, YouTube)' was introduced - NetMiner can analyze networks between user and text at the same time. (Version: 4.4.0)
Current(2018.12) version: 4.4.2

Extension
NetMiner Extension is small program to extend the functionality of NetMiner. In other words, it enables you to customize NetMiner according to your needs. By adding ‘NetMiner Extension’, you can expand your research.

Download data from web 

 SNS Data Collector: It collects social media data from Facebook, YouTube or Twitter, which have a large number of social media users worldwide.

File formats

NetMiner data file format 

.NMF

Importable/exportable formats

Plain text data: .TXT, .CSV
MS-Excel data: .XLS, .XLSX
NetMiner 2 data: .NTF
UCINet data: .DL, .DAT
Pajek data: .NET, .VEC, .CLU, .PER
StOCNET data file: .DAT
Graph Modelling Language data: .GML(importing only)
Unstructured text data: .TXT, .CSV

Data structure

Hierarchy of NetMiner data structure

A DataSet is a basic unit in NetMiner and used as an input data for all the analysis and visualization Modules. A DataSet is composed of four types of data items: Main Nodeset, Sub Nodeset, 1-mode Network data and 2-mode Network data. A DataSet can have only one Main Nodeset. But multiple 1-mode Network data can be contained in a DataSet. Moreover, a DataSet contains multiple Sub Nodesets and multiple 2-mode Network data. ProcessLogs which are generated by analysis and visualization process can be managed with a DataSet in a Workfile. A Project contains independent multiple Workfiles. A number of nodes in Main NodeSet of each workfile does not need to be the same. In this way, the hierarchy of NetMiner data structure is as follow:

Script workbench in NetMiner 4

NetMiner 4 equips script workbench based on Python script language with script generator which enables users to generate a programmable script automatically. Then users can operate functions in NetMiner 4 by using GUI or programmable script language. Most functions of NetMiner can be performed using script rather than clicking menu so that complicated series of commands can be stored in script and executed repeatedly. Various existing libraries written by Python can be applicable within NetMiner 4 without any modifications, and ordinary data structures which were provided by Python can be defined. Users can develop their own algorithms by combinations of NetMiner features. A generated script file can be added to NetMiner 4 as a one of menu by a form of plug-in which can be shared with other NetMiner users. Using loops, conditionals, in-depth analysis is available. And users can create and use a batch file which is executed automatically for NetMiner.

See also 
 Social network analysis software
 Semantic network analysis

References

External links

 NetMiner official website

Social network analysis software
Windows-only software
Data analysis software